The 26 Baku Commissars were Bolshevik and Left Socialist Revolutionary (SR) members of the Baku Commune. The commune was established in the city of Baku, which was then the capital of the briefly independent Azerbaijan Democratic Republic, and is now the capital of the Republic of Azerbaijan. The commune, led by Stepan Shahumyan, existed until 26 July 1918 when the Bolsheviks were forced out of power by a coalition of Dashnaks, Right SRs, and Mensheviks.

After their overthrow, the Baku commissars attempted to leave Baku but were captured by the Centrocaspian Dictatorship and imprisoned. On 14 September 1918, during the fall of Baku to Ottoman forces, Red Army soldiers broke into their prison and freed the commissars; they then boarded a ship to Krasnovodsk, where they were promptly arrested by local authorities and, on the night of 20 September 1918, executed by a firing squad between the stations of Pereval and Akhcha-Kuyma on the Transcaspian Railway by soldiers of the Ashkhabad Committee. They were executed for essentially letting Islamic Army of the Caucasus seize Baku.

Baku Commune 
The Baku Commune lasted from 13 April to 25 July 1918. It came to power after the bloody confrontation with the Muslim population, known as the March Days in Baku. During its brief existence the Commune had to face several problems: from the shortage of food and supplies to the threat of a strong Ottoman Empire Army which wanted to attack Baku. Despite the difficult conditions, the Commune carried out several social reforms, such as the nationalization of the oil industry. This is how the writer Victor Serge described the situation in May, June and July and the state of the small Red Army of Baku:

On April 25, 1918, at a meeting of the Baku Council, the Baku Council of People's Commissars (Sovnarkom) was formed, consisting of Bolsheviks and Left Social Revolutionaries. The Bolsheviks entered the Baku Council of People's Commissars: Stepan Shaumyan (Chairman of the Council of People's Commissars and People's Commissar for Foreign Affairs), Prokopius Dzhaparidze (People's Commissar for Internal Affairs), Yakov Zevin (People's Commissar of Labor), Meshadi Azizbekov (provincial Commissar), Grigory Korganov (People's Commissar for Military and Naval Affairs), Nariman Narimanov (People's Commissar of Municipal Economy), Ivan Fioletov (People's Commissar of the National Economy), A.B. Karinyan (People's Commissar of Justice), N N. Kolesnikova (People's Commissar of Education); and the left SRs: Mir Hasan Vezirov (People's Commissar of Agriculture), I. Sukhartsev (People's Commissar of Railways, Sea Transport, Posts and Telegraphs). And the Chairman of the Cheka for Combating Counterrevolution under the Baksovnarkom became the Bolshevik Sahak Ter-Gabrielyan.

On 5 June 1918 the Baku Red Army repulsed an assault by overwhelming Ottoman troops, but later it launched an unsuccessful assault on Ganja, the headquarters of the Ottoman Army of Islam, and was obliged to retreat to Baku.
At this point, Dashnaks, Right SRs and Mensheviks started to negotiate with General Dunsterville, the commander of the British troops in Persia, inviting his troops to Baku in order to defend the city from an imminent Ottoman attack. The Bolsheviks and their leftist allies opposed this scheme, but on 25 July the majority of the Soviet voted to call in the British, and the Bolsheviks resigned.
The Baku Commune was imprisoned for participation in unlawful military formations and militarized robbery, particularly for the March Days atrocities and was replaced by the Central-Caspian Dictatorship.

In contrast to what happened in many parts of Russia, where the Bolsheviks earned a reputation for ruthlessness executing those who did not support them, the Bolsheviks of Baku were not so strict. The Cheka in Baku executed only two persons, both members of the Soviet caught in embezzling public funds: the Commissar for Finance, Aleksandr Kireev, and the commissar of the steamship Meve, Sergei Pokrovskii.

The executions 

After the fall of the Baku Soviet in July 1918, the Bolshevik leaders and some loyal troops tried to reach Astrakhan, the only Caspian port still in Bolshevik hands. However, their ship was intercepted by the military vessels of the Caspian fleet and after undergoing an hour's bombardment in mid-sea they surrendered and returned to Baku. Most of the Bolshevik militants were arrested and remained in prison until, after the fall of Baku to the Turks, a commando unit led by Anastas Mikoyan freed them from their prison.

Shahumyan, Dzhaparidze, Azizbekov, and their comrades, along with Mikoyan, then boarded the ship Turkmen, intending to reach Astrakhan by sea. According to recent historians, the sailors chose instead to sail to Krasnovodsk for fear of being arrested in Astrakhan. At Krasnovodsk the commissars were arrested by the town's commandant who requested further orders from the "Ashkhabad Committee", led by the Socialist Revolutionary Fyodor Funtikov, about what should be done with them. Three days later, British Major-General Wilfrid Malleson, on hearing of their arrest, contacted Britain's liaison-officer in Ashkhabad, Captain Reginald Teague-Jones, to suggest that the commissars be handed over to British forces to be used as hostages in exchange for British citizens held by the Soviets. That same day, Teague-Jones attended the committee's meeting in Ashkabad which had the task of deciding the fate of the Commissars. For some reason Teague-Jones did not communicate Malleson's request to the committee, and claimed he left before a decision was made. He further claimed that next day he discovered the committee had eventually decided to issue orders that the commissars should be executed. According to historian Richard H. Ullman, Teague-Jones could have stopped the executions if he wanted since the Ashkabad Committee was dependent on British support and could not refuse a request from its powerful ally, but he decided not to do so.

On the night of 20 September, three days after being arrested, twenty-six of the commissars were executed by a firing squad between the stations of Pereval and Akhcha-Kuyma on the Trans-Caspian railway. How Anastas Mikoyan, who was part of the group, managed to survive is still uncertain, as is the reason why his life was spared. In 1922, V. Chaikin, a Socialist Revolutionary journalist, published a description of the moments before the execution.

Impact 

Soviet officials later blamed the executions on British agents acting in the Baku area at the time. When Soviet rule was established in the whole Caspian area, Funtikov, the head of the Ashkhabad 'Directorate' responsible for the executions, was imprisoned. Funtikov put all blame for the executions onto Britain, and in particular Teague-Jones who, he claimed, had ordered him to have the commissars shot. Funtikov was tried and shot in Baku in 1926. Britain denied involvement in the incident, saying it was done by local officials without any knowledge of the British.

This accusation caused a further souring of relations between Britain and the fledgling Soviet government and helped lead to the confrontational attitude of both sides in the coming years.

According to Soviet historiography, two British officers on board the commissars' ship ordered it to sail to Krasnovodsk instead of Astrakhan, where they found a government led by SRs and British officers who immediately ordered the arrest of the commissars. The Soviets would later immortalize the death of the 26 commissars through, among other things, movies, artwork, stamps, and public works including the 26 Commissars Memorial in Baku. In Isaak Brodsky's famous painting, British officers are depicted as being present at the executions.

Soviet investigations
Boris Vladimirovich Sennikov published a book in 2004 about his findings on the Tambov Rebellion where he mentioned several facts about the event.

Sennikov claims that the famous Brodsky's painting is an invention of the Soviet historiography. The truth was established by the special commission of the All-Russian Central Executive Committee (VTsIK) that arrived from Moscow. The commission was headed by Vadim Chaikin (PSR). The commission also consisted of a big group of a high-ranking Moscow's Cheka officers headed by Yakov Peters, an international criminal associated with the Siege of Sidney Street. Sennikov also brings up a quote of Chaikin in the article of Suren Gazaryan "That should not be repeated" in the Leningrad magazine "Zvezda": "The painting of Brodsky Execution of the 26 Baku Commissars is historically false. They were not shot, but rather decapitated. And the executioner of the penalty was a single man - a Turkmen, a gigantic strength bogatyr. That Turkmen by himself with his own hands using a shashka beheaded all of them." The pit with remains of the commissars and their heads was uncovered under the surveillance of the VTsIK special commission and representatives of Cheka. The report on the death of Baku commissars was sent by the commission to VTsIK, Sovnarkom, and the Central Committee of RKP(b).

In 1922 Vadim Chaikin published his book To the history of the Russian Revolution through the Grazhbin Publishing (Moscow) commemorating the first part "Execution of 26 Baku Commissars" to the event. After serving time in the Oryol Prison Chaikin on 11 September 1941 he was executed by a firing squad along with 156 other Oryol prison inmates during the Medvedev Forest massacre.

The Commissars 

The twenty-six "Baku Commissars" were not all commissars and were not all Bolsheviks; some of them were Left SRs and Dashnaks. There were many ethnicities among them: Greek, Latvian, Jewish, Russian, Georgian, Armenian and Azerbaijani.

The 26 "commissars" were:
 Stepan Shaumian – Chairman of the Baku Council of the People's Commissars, Commissar Extraordinary for the Caucasus
 Meshadi Azizbekov – Deputy People's Commissar of Internal Affairs, gubernial commissar for Baku
 Prokopius Dzhaparidze – Chairman of the executive committee of the Baku Soviet
 Ivan Fioletov – Chairman of the Soviet of National Economy
 Mir-Hasan Vazirov – People's Commissar for Agriculture
 Grigory Korganov – People's Commissar for Military and Navy Affairs
 Yakov Zevin – People's Commissar for Labor
 Grigory Petrov – Military Commissar of the Baku region from the Sovnarkom of the Russian SFSR
 Ivan Malygin – Deputy Chairman of the Military Revolutionary Committee of the Caucasian Army
 Arsen Amiryan – Chief Editor of Baku Worker newspaper
 Meyer Velkovich Basin – Member of the Military Revolutionary Committee
 Suren Osepyan – Chief Editor of Izvestia of the Baku Council newspaper
 Eizhen Berg – Sailor
 Vladimir Polukhin – Collegiate Commissar for Military and Navy Affairs of the Russian SFSR
 Fyodor Solntsev – Commissar of the military instruction school 
 Armenak Boriyan – Journalist
 Ivan Gabyshev – Political commissar of a brigade
 Mark Koganov – Member of the Military Revolutionary Committee
 Bagdasar Avakyan – Military Commandant of Baku
 Irakly Metaksa – Shahumyan's bodyguard
 Ivan Nikolayshvili – Dzhaparidze's bodyguard
 Aram Kostandyan – Deputy People's Commissar for Agriculture
 Solomon Bogdanov – Member of the Military Revolutionary Committee
 Anatoly Bogdanov – Clerk
 Isay Mishne – Secretary of the Military Revolutionary Committee
 Tatevos Amirov – Commander of a cavalry unit, member of Dashnaktsutiun

Demolition of the 26 Commissars Memorial and reburial
In January 2009, the Baku authorities began the demolition of the city's 26 Commissars Memorial. This was the latest monument of several that had been built to commemorate the Commissars erected in that park during the Soviet period. This last monument itself had been fenced-off since July 2008. The remains of the commissars were reburied at Hovsan Cemetery on 26 January 2009, with participation of Muslim, Jewish and Christian clergy, who conducted religious ceremonies.

The dismantling was opposed by some local left-wingers and by the Azerbaijan Communist Party in particular. It also upset Armenia as the Armenian public believed that the demolition and reburial was motivated by the reluctance of the Azerbaijanis, after the Nagorno-Karabakh War to have ethnic Armenians buried in the center of their capital. Another scandal happened when Azerbaijani press reports claimed that during the exhumation only 21 bodies were discovered and that "Shahumyan and four other Armenian commissars managed to escape their murderers". This report was questioned by Shahumyan's granddaughter Tatyana, now living in Moscow, who told the Russian daily Kommersant that:

Almost all monuments in Azerbaijan dedicated to the commissars including Shahumyan, Azizbekov, Dzhaparidze and Fioletov, have been demolished. Most streets named after the commissars have been renamed.

Trivia

Russian prominent poet Sergei Yesenin wrote "Ballad of the Twenty-six" to commemorate the Baku Commissars, poem first published in The Baku Worker, 22 September 1925.

Russian band WOMBA named one of its albums The 27th Baku Commissar.

Italian prominent writer Tiziano Terzani wrote about the Baku Commissars in his book Buonanotte, signor Lenin (Goodnight, Mr Lenin: A Journey Through the End of the Soviet Empire, 1992).

A street in southwest-central Moscow is named after the 26 Baku Commisars {Ulitsa 26 Bakinskikh Komissarov

See also 
 Transcaspian Government

References

Further reading

External links

Nine Photos of past monuments dedicated to the 26 Baku Commissars, plus photo of the funeral. Azerbaijan International, Vol. 15:2–4 (2011), pp. 167–169.
 26 Baku Commissars

Leninism
Executed politicians
1918 in Azerbaijan
Commissars
Articles containing video clips
Communism in Azerbaijan